Yew-Kwang Ng  (English pronunciation  or simply ; born August 7, 1942) is a Malaysian-Australian economist, who is currently Special Chair Professor of Economics at Fudan University, Shanghai, and a Distinguished Fellow of the Academy of the Social Sciences in Australia. He has published in a variety of academic disciplines and is best known for his work in welfare economics.

Life and work 
Yew-Kwang Ng was born during WW2, in Japanese-occupied Malaya. While in high school, he was drawn to studying economics because of his ambition to "establish communism in an independent Malaysia"; the Cultural Revolution in China and events in the Soviet Union later led Ng to change his mind about the viability of communism. Ng graduated with a Bachelor of Commerce from Nanyang University in 1966 and later a Ph.D. from the University of Sydney in 1971. During his studies at Nanyang University, amid the unrest of demonstrations and strikes, Ng came close to being arrested or expelled several times.

During the 1980s, working as a columnist, Ng wrote in support of Deng Xiaoping's Chinese economic reforms. Ng has been a Fellow of the Academy of the Social Sciences in Australia since 1981. He held a chair as professor of economics at Monash University between 1985 and 2012 and is now an emeritus professor. Between 2013 and 2019, Ng held the Winsemius chair at the Department of Economics at Nanyang Technological University. In 2018, Ng delivered the inaugural Atkinson Memorial lecture at the University of Oxford, dedicated to the memory of Sir Tony Atkinson. Since July 2019, Ng holds the position of Special Chair Professor at the School of Economics at Fudan University, Shanghai. He is also a columnist for the Chinese business news NetEase Finance online portal.

Research 
Ng has written or co-authored more than 30 books and published more than two hundred refereed papers in economics and papers on biology, mathematics, philosophy, cosmology, psychology, and sociology. He proposed welfare biology as an academic discipline, stating that this has been his more underestimated contribution. He published his first academic paper in the Journal of Political Economy, one of the top five economics journals, while he was still an undergraduate student.

Economics 
Ng is renowned for his work in welfare economics and a majority of his academic papers are in this area. He wrote his first book on the topic in 1979, Welfare Economics: Introduction and Development of Basic Concepts. Within welfare economics, he is particularly known for his work on the theory of the third best, social choice theory and happiness economics. In many publications, he defends a view of utility as being both cardinally measurable and interpersonally comparable.

Ng coined the term "mesoeconomics" and helped establish the field as a simplified, tractable general-equilibrium analysis with both micro and macro elements. As a method, it is used to study the implications of imperfect competition on the macroeconomy. It has been argued that mesoeconomics "typically yields conclusions that are consistently more closely aligned with empirical evidence than any of the competing macroeconomic models."

Ng contributed to the development of the new field of inframarginal economics, which "provides an analytical framework [...] to reconcile the focus of neoclassical economics on distribution with the preoccupations of classical economists [...] regarding the division of labour." He collaborated with Xiaokai Yang on this topic and in 1993 they published the joint book Specialization and Economic Organization: A New Classical Microeconomic Framework, which was said to have "credibly  challenged  Neoclassical  Economics".

Moral philosophy 
In moral philosophy, Ng advocates for the consequentialist position of hedonistic utilitarianism. He has defended this view in various academic papers, some of which were jointly written with the utilitarian moral philosopher Peter Singer. He also argues for this position in his 2000 book Efficiency, Equality, and Public Policy.

Thanks to his early work on animal welfare, global catastrophic risks and the measurement of wellbeing, he is credited with originating many ideas that would later be incorporated into the philosophy of effective altruism. In a 2020 paper, Ng analyses the implications of the economic theory of the second best for effective altruism, arguing that we live in a "third best" world where informational and administrative constraints prevent us from realising the second best outcomes.

Awards and honours 
Ng has received a number of awards in recognition of his work. In 2007, he was made a Distinguished Fellow of the Economic Society of Australia, the highest award that the Society bestows. In the tribute associated with the award, he was described as "one of Australia's most important and best internationally known economists." According to Economics Nobel Laureate Kenneth Arrow, Ng is "one of the leading economic theorists of his generation" and Nobel Laureate James Buchanan credited him to have "made major contributions in theoretical Welfare Economics."

After Ng's retirement from Monash University, he was recognised as an "honorary and adjunct appointment" by the Department of Economics. Given Ng's interest in global priorities research, he is on the advisory board of the Global Priorities Institute at the University of Oxford.

Politics 
Ng has stated that "trying to avoid excessive inequality [is] a very important issue, and likely the third most important public issue after environmental protections and peacekeeping". He is also a proponent of generous immigration policies, stating that "immigrants bring in factors complementary to the local ones and make the economy more vibrant".

In 2020, Ng wrote a column which suggested that allowing polyandry could be a way for China to reduce problems arising from the male-skewed gender ratio in the country. Ng also stated his intention to write a follow-up column discussing the pros and cons of legalizing prostitution. The column went viral and attracted heavy criticism online; many critics said that Ng's arguments were misogynistic and offensive, while others objected to polyandry as contrary to traditional marriage.

Philanthropy 
In 2015, Ng offered to match all donations to up to $25,000 to the charity organization Animal Ethics, a nonprofit organization aiming to promote animal ethics and to provide information and resources for animal advocates.

At the Nanyang Technological University Chinese Heritage Centre's Mid-Autumn Festival charity auction in 2016, Ng and his wife donated , which went towards the purchase of a painting by Master Yang Bailiang, a Chinese artist, which Ng donated to the centre and is now on permanent display.

Select bibliography

Articles
  1982. "A Micro-Macroeconomic Analysis Based on a Representative Firm," Economica, N.S., 49(194), p p. 121-139.
 1984. "Quasi-Pareto Social Improvements," American Economic Review, 74(5), p p. 1033-1050.
1990. "Welfarism and Utilitarianism: A Rehabilitation": Utilitas 2 (2): pp. 171–193. Abstract.
 1992. "Business Confidence and Depression Prevention: A Mesoeconomic Perspective," American Economic Review, 82(2), p p. 365-371.
 1995. "Towards Welfare Biology: Evolutionary Economics of Animal Consciousness and Suffering," Biology and Philosophy, 10(3), pp. 255–285. Abstract.
 1997. "A Case for Happiness, Cardinalism, and Interpersonal Comparability," Economic Journal, 107(445), p p. 1848-1858.  
1999. "Utility, informed preference, or happiness: Following Harsanyi's argument to its logical conclusion", Social Choice and Welfare, 16, pp. 197–216. Abstract.
2001. "Welfare-reducing Growth Despite Individual and Government Optimization," Social Choice and Welfare, 18(3), pp. 497–506 with Siang Ng Abstract.
  2001. "Is Public Spending Good for You?," World Economics, 2(2), pp. 1–17, with Harold Bierman. Abstract.
  2003. "From Preference to Happiness: Towards a More Complete Welfare Economics, Social Choice and Welfare, 20(2), pp. 307-350. Abstract.
 2006. "Population Dynamics and Animal Welfare: Issues Raised by the Culling of Kangaroos in Puckapunyal," Social Choice and Welfare, 27(2), pp. 407–422, with Matthew Clarke. 
 2007. "Eternal Coase and External Costs: A Case for Bilateral Taxation and Amenity Rights, European Journal of Political Economy, 23(3), pp. 641–659. Abstract.
2011. "Happiness Is Absolute, Universal, Ultimate, Unidimensional, Cardinally Measurable and Interpersonally Comparable: A Basis for the Environmentally Responsible Happy Nation Index," Monash Economics Working Papers 16–11. Abstract.
2011. "Consumption tradeoff vs. catastrophes avoidance: implications of some recent results in happiness studies on the economics of climate change," Climatic Change, 105: 109. Abstract.
2016. "How welfare biology and common sense may help to reduce animal suffering," Animal Sentience, 7. Abstract.
2016. "The Importance of Global Extinction in Climate Change Policy," Global Policy, 7(3), pp. 315–322. Abstract.
2017. "Towards a Theory of Third‐Best," Pacific Economic Review, 22(2), pp. 155–166. Abstract.
2020. "Effective altruism despite the second-best challenge: Should indirect effects Be taken into account for policies for a better future?," Futures, 121. Abstract.

Books
 1979 and 1983. Welfare Economics (London: Macmillan)
 1986. Mesoeconomics: A Micro-Macro Analysis (London: Wheatsheaf)
 1990. Social Welfare and Economic Policy (London: Wheatsheaf)
 1993. Specialization and Economic Organization (Amsterdam: North-Holland, with X. Yang)
  1994. The Unparalleled Mystery  (Beijing: Writers Press). 
 1998. Increasing Returns and Economic Analysis, ed. with Kenneth Arrow and X. Yang (London: Macmillan)
 1999. Economics and Happiness (Collected papers in Chinese) (Taipei: Maw Chang)
 2000. Efficiency, Equality, and Public Policy: With a Case for Higher Public Spending (London: Macmillan)
 2011. Common Mistakes in Economics by the Public, Students, Economists & Nobel Laureates (New York: Nova Science Publishers)
 2019. Markets and Morals: Justifying Kidney Sales and Legalizing Prostitution (Cambridge: Cambridge University Press)
 2020. Evolved-God Creationism (Newcastle upon Tyne: Cambridge Scholars Publishing)
 2022. Happiness—Concept, Measurement and Promotion (New York: Springer)

References

External links

Yew-Kwang Ng's Home Page
Yew-Kwang Ng's Google Scholar homepage
EconPapers of Yew-Kwang Ng

1942 births
Living people
20th-century Australian male writers
21st-century Australian male writers
20th-century Malaysian writers
21st-century Malaysian writers
Animal welfare scholars
Australian economics writers
Australian economists
Consequentialists
Fellows of the Academy of the Social Sciences in Australia
Academic staff of Fudan University
Malaysian economists
Malaysian non-fiction writers
Malaysian people of Chinese descent
Academic staff of Monash University
Nanyang University alumni
People associated with effective altruism
University of Sydney alumni
Utilitarians
Welfare economists